Taalyogi Pandit Suresh Talwalkar (born 1948) is an Indian musician who plays the percussion instrument tabla.

Performing career
Talwalkar was born in 1948 into a Marathi family in Chembur, Mumbai. He belongs to the Keertankar  family of Shri Dholebuva. Keertana being a classical form of devotional and musical discourse, a liking for the classical music was inculcated in him right in the childhood. He initially learned playing the tabla from his father Dattatrey Talwalkar. He trained under tabla players Pandit Pandharinath Nageshkar , Vinayakrao Ghangrekar and Ramdutt Patil and studied the rhythm theory of Carnatic music and Hindustani classical singing.

His style draws from several gharanas (stylistic schools) and he accompanied classical musicians and dancers; Talwalkar frequently performed with sarangi player Ram Narayan since the late 1960s, accompanied classical singer Ulhas Kashalkar, and has toured in the United States, Europe, and Africa. He taught tabla players, including Ramdas Palsule, Vijay Ghate and Western drummers. Talwalkar was awarded the All India Radio Award in 1966, the Sangeet Natak Akademi Award in 2004 and Padma Shri in 2013.

Talwalkar is married to classical singer Padma Talwalkar and they have a daughter, tabla player Savani Talwalkar, and a son, Mumbai businessman and tabla player Satyajit Talwalkar.

Title

The title TaalYogi was conferred on Suresh Talwalkar by His Holiness Jagatguru Shankaracharya Shri Vidya Shankar Bharthi, Karveer Peeth, Kolhapur in 2001.

Awards 

 Talwalkar received the Padma Shri in 2013. 
 He was awarded the All  India Radio Award in 1966
 Andhra Pradesh Government Award in 1998
 ‘Tyagaraj Award’ by Shri Naad Bramha, Chembur in 2002
 Sangeet Natak Academi Award in 2004, Awarded by The President of India Dr. A.P.J. Abdul Kalam Azad
 ‘Vishnu Digambar Paluskar’ Award by Gandharva Mahavidyalaya, Pune in 2004
 ‘Ratna Puraskar’ awarded by Swarsadhana, Mumbai in 2008
 ‘Sangeet Poornacharya’ Title Awarded by His Holiness Poornavad Vardhishnu Param pujya Shri Vishnu Maharaj Parnekar in 2008
 ITC Sangeet Research Academy Award, Kolkata, West zone of India in 2009
 Honoured by Swar-Sadhana, Pandharpur in 2009

References

External links 

1948 births
Hindustani instrumentalists
Living people
Recipients of the Sangeet Natak Akademi Award
Tabla players
Recipients of the Padma Shri in arts
Indian male classical musicians
Musicians from Mumbai